K.K. Narayanan is an Indian politician from the state of Kerala, and was a member of the Legislative Assembly of Kerala from 2011 to 2016. He represented the Dharmadom constituency of Kerala and is a member of the Communist Party of India (Marxist) (CPI(M)) political party. He was born at Peralassery on 15 February 1948.

Political career
He was the president of Kannur District Panchayat and Kannur District Co-operative Bank. He is also a Member of C.P.I.(M) Kannur District Secretariat. Also he is the president, Motor Labourers Union (C.I.T.U.) Kannur District Committee, Chairman of Vismaya Amusement Park, Kannur and President, A.K.G. Co-operative Hospital.

External links
K.K. Narayanana MLA

1948 births
Living people
Communist Party of India (Marxist) politicians
Kerala MLAs 2016–2021
Kerala MLAs 2011–2016
People from Kannur district